Yuri Lukin (born April 23, 1962 in Barnaul, Russia) is the general manager of Lokomotiv Yaroslavl, a Russian professional ice hockey team playing in the Kontinental Hockey League (KHL).

References

External links
Yuri Lukin profile at EliteProspects.com

Living people
1962 births
People from Barnaul